Tao Lujia (February 1917 – May 21, 2011) was a People's Republic of China politician. He was born in Liyang, Jiangsu. He was Chinese Communist Party Committee Secretary and Chinese People's Political Consultative Conference Committee Chairman of Shanxi. He was an alternate member of the 8th Central Committee of the Chinese Communist Party and a full member of the 10th Central Committee of the Chinese Communist Party. He was delegate to the 1st National People's Congress and 3rd National People's Congress.

6
1917 births
2011 deaths
People's Republic of China politicians from Jiangsu
Chinese Communist Party politicians from Jiangsu
Political office-holders in Shanxi
CPPCC Committee Chairmen of Shanxi
People from Liyang
Alternate members of the 8th Central Committee of the Chinese Communist Party
Members of the 10th Central Committee of the Chinese Communist Party
Delegates to the 1st National People's Congress
Delegates to the 3rd National People's Congress
Delegates to the National People's Congress from Shanxi